The 2009 Valencia Formula Two round was the first round of the 2009 FIA Formula Two Championship season. It was held on 30 and 31 May 2009 at Circuit de Valencia at Valencia, Spain. The first race was won by Robert Wickens, with Carlos Iaconelli and Kazim Vasiliauskas also on the podium. The second race was again won by Robert Wickens, with Mirko Bortolotti and Philipp Eng also on the podium.

Classification

Qualifying 1
Weather/Track: Sun 25°/Dry 35°

Qualifying 2
Weather: Sun 23°; Track: Dry 38°

Race 1
Weather: Sun 28°; Track: Dry 49°

Race 2
Weather: Cloud 26 °C; Track: Dry 29 °C

Standings after the race
Drivers' Championship standings

References

FIA Formula Two Championship